Shane is an American Western television series which aired on ABC in 1966. It was based on the 1949 book of the same name by Jack Schaefer and the 1953 classic film starring Alan Ladd. David Carradine portrayed the titular character in the television series, a former gunfighter and sometimes outlaw who takes a job as a hired hand at the ranch of a widowed woman, her son, and her father-in-law.

Premise
The series follows the 1953 film in its general premise, even in the lead character's buckskin shirt and concho gun belt, but departs from it in several important aspects:
 
The Shane, Marian, and Joey characters are much younger; Marian is a widow who lives with her father-in-law Tom, and Shane has lived with them for a while already when the story starts. That is the basis for a romance subplot that constitutes the arch of the whole series; nearly every person who meets them supposes Shane and Marian are a couple. Her father-in-law approves it, and the boy Joey idolizes Shane. However, as she doesn't dare to give the first step (even less when Shane is a man who gives no hint of any romantic interest), and he sees himself as the least desirable suitor Marian could ever have, their mutual feelings aren't expressed.

Despite his wish to leave that part of his life behind, Shane resorts to his gun often, which prompts Tom Starett's comment that he is as addicted to it as Tom himself is addicted to alcohol. That also means that the homesteaders tend to see him as a defender as much as a danger.

The action happens around a settlement called Crossroads, which has no law officer, judge, or physician. For that reason Sam Grafton is a more important character, functioning as everybody's counselor, and even as an emergency surgeon. His helper Ben is also a more defined and comical character than in the movie.

Rufe Ryker, the open-range cattleman, alive here until the end of the series, has his own dramatic arc: he starts as an absolute enemy of the “sodbusters”, as evil and ruthless as in the movie. Later, he becomes the occasional ally of Shane or the homesteaders when his interests are affected or a common danger approaches; also, given the strength he has by his team of cowhands, he functions as a law enforcer. The character evolves to the point that at the end he is an acceptable suitor for Marian's hand. Bert Freed as Ryker started the season clean-shaven and let his beard grow from week to week, never shaving throughout the rest of the series, adding a rather unique element of verisimilitude.

Cast
 David Carradine as Shane
 Jill Ireland as Marian Starett
 Chris Shea as Joey Starett
 Tom Tully as Tom Starett
 Bert Freed as Rufe Ryker
 Sam Gilman as Grafton
 Owen Bush as Ben
 Lawrence Mann as Harve
 Ned Romero as Chips

Cast comparison

Production
The series was shot at the Paramount Studios and the Paramount Ranch, California, unlike the 1953 movie, whose exteriors were shot in Wyoming. That makes the characters be seen carrying slickers on their saddles while riding in a rather dry landscape.

In 1966, after Paramount sold the rights to ABC, the TV company got Herbert Brodkin and his Titus Productions, Inc. Brodkin offered the producer job to Denne Bart Petitclerc, with David Shaw as executive producer; William Blinn was offered the job of story editor (credited as story consultant).

According to Blinn, as Brodkin came from the experience of shows shot in interiors like The Defenders, The Nurses and Coronet Blue, Shane rarely went on location and was a minimalist western of sorts because the Brodkin organization would not permit any deficit spending. Still, Brodkin gave the series his characteristic quality of production, strong characterizations, and stories that asked the audience to think.

The biggest problem Shane faced was the inevitable comparison to the 1953 movie; the greatest asset they had to overcome that obstacle was the casting of David Carradine: “David was kind of that character. He’s got his own rhythms, he’s got his own stance and attitude and point of view, and that’s a good and creative thing to do,” stated Blinn. Also, the quality of the show rested on team effort, with the inclusion of the cast in story conferences, the hiring of talented directors like Robert Butler or David Greene, and writers as Ernest Kinoy.

Toward the cancellation of the series, the Brodkin organization cut back the budget drastically; according to Blinn, what doomed the series was ABC asking for more action, and Brodkin refusing, arguing the need to stay within the assigned budget, and doing the show in his own way. Also, the low ratings were decisive: Shane had been put in the time slot of the Saturday nights, opposite The Jackie Gleason Show, one of the most popular TV programs of the time.

Episode list

Home media
On March 10, 2015, Timeless Media Group released Shane: The Complete Series on DVD in Region 1.

References

External links

 
 
 

1960s Western (genre) television series
American Broadcasting Company original programming
1966 American television series debuts
1966 American television series endings
Television shows based on American novels
Television remakes of films
Television series by CBS Studios